Eduarda Bittencourt Simões (born October 8, 1987), better known as Duda Beat (stylized in all caps as DUDA BEAT), is a Brazilian singer and songwriter. She won the ACPA Award for Breakthrough Artist in 2018, and her debut album Sinto Muito was listed among Rolling Stone Brasil&apos;s best 50 Brazilian records of that year.

Biography 
Eduarda Bittencourt Simões was born on October 8, 1987, in Recife, the capital of the Brazilian state of Pernambuco. She is the daughter of Suyenne Bittencourt and Tárciso Simões. While she originally used the stage name “Duda Bitt”, the artist later decided to adopt the name Duda Beat in homage to the countercultural manguebeat movement.

At age 18, she moved to Rio de Janeiro. In April 2018, she graduated with a degree in political science from the Federal University of the State of Rio de Janeiro, publishing an article on evangelical Christianity and Brazilian politics. In the same month, she began her professional music career, releasing her debut album Sinto Muito.

Duda Beat is married to Tomás Tróia, a producer of her two albums and member of her band.

Discography

Studio albums

Extended plays

Singles

As lead artist

As featured artist

References

1987 births
Living people
Brazilian singer-songwriters
Brazilian women singer-songwriters
Brazilian women pop singers
21st-century Brazilian women singers
21st-century Brazilian singers
Women in Latin music